Robert Thomas Stauber (born November 25, 1967) is an American ice hockey coach and former player. He was the head coach of the United States women's national ice hockey team. He played the goaltender position at the University of Minnesota and professionally with the Los Angeles Kings and Buffalo Sabres of the National Hockey League.

Stauber played three seasons for the Minnesota Golden Gophers men's ice hockey team from 1986 to 1989. He was the first goaltender to win the Hobey Baker Award after his sophomore season in 1988.

Between 1989 and 1995, Stauber played 62 NHL regular season games. He was drafted in the sixth round, 107th overall, by the Los Angeles Kings in the 1986 NHL Entry Draft.

A 1986 graduate of Duluth Denfeld High School, Stauber was chosen as the 63rd best player in Minnesota boys' high school hockey history.

College career

Sources:

Professional hockey career
Stauber made his National Hockey League debut with the Kings during the 1989–90 season, appearing in two games. After two years in the minors, he played in 53 games for Kings between the 1992–93 and 1993–94 seasons.

He was traded (along with Alexei Zhitnik, Charlie Huddy, and a draft pick) to the Buffalo Sabres (for Grant Fuhr, Denis Tsygurov, and Philippe Boucher) during the 1994–95 season.  Stauber appeared in just one game with the Kings and six games with the Sabres in that season, his last in the NHL. His career NHL stats are 21-23-9 W-L-T, 3.81 GAA, .890 save percentage, and one shutout in 62 games.

Stauber spent 1995 to 1999 in the AHL and IHL. From 2002 to 2006, he played a few games in three different seasons with the Jacksonville Barracudas in three different leagues, the Atlantic Coast Hockey League, WHA2, and Southern Professional Hockey League.

In 1996, he scored a goal while playing for the Rochester Americans.

Coaching career
Stauber coached at the University of Minnesota's Gophers men's hockey program as their goalie coach from 2000 to 2008, during which the Gophers won back to back NCAA National Titles in 2002 and 2003.

Stauber served as head coach for the USA Hockey Women's National Team in the 2017 World Championships and the 2018 Winter Olympic Games where his team won their first Gold Medal since 1998. Starting with the program in 2010, he was an assistant coach at the 2014 Winter Olympic Games. In the first tournament after he was named permanent head coach, he coached the US to a gold medal in the 2017 IIHF Women's World Championship.

Bandy career
Stauber also played bandy with the Dynamo Duluth. He was selected to the United States national team for the 2010 World Championship.

Career statistics

Regular season and playoffs

International

References

External links
 

1967 births
Living people
AHCA Division I men's ice hockey All-Americans
American bandy players
American men's ice hockey goaltenders
Buffalo Sabres players
Hartford Wolf Pack players
Hobey Baker Award winners
Ice hockey people from Duluth, Minnesota
Jacksonville Barracudas (ACHL) players
Jacksonville Barracudas (SPHL) players
Jacksonville Barracudas (WHA2) players
Los Angeles Kings draft picks
Los Angeles Kings players
Manitoba Moose (IHL) players
Minnesota Golden Gophers men's ice hockey coaches
Minnesota Golden Gophers men's ice hockey players
New Haven Nighthawks players
Phoenix Roadrunners (IHL) players
Portland Pirates players
Rochester Americans players